Ephestiodes erasa is a species of snout moth in the genus Ephestiodes. It was described by Carl Heinrich in 1956. It is found in the US states of Florida and Georgia.

References

Moths described in 1956
Phycitinae